SF3 may refer to:

 Street Fighter III, a video game
 Shining Force 3, a video game
 Star Fox Adventures, the third game in the overall Star Fox franchise
 The Saab 340 turboprop airplane
 The Society for the Furtherance of the Study of Fantasy and Science Fiction or (SF)3, the Wisconsin not-for-profit literary organization which puts on WisCon
 Syphon Filter 3, a video game
 Secret Files 3, a 2013 point-and-click adventure game
 Sulfur trifluoride, a chemical compound.
 Sound Font 3 file format extension supported by the MuseScore music annotation software.